Gusu may refer to:

 Gusu District in China
 Gusu language of Nigeria
 Gusu woodland in southern Africa